The Victoria robber (Brycinus jacksonii) is a species of fish in the family Alestidae. It is found in Kenya, Rwanda, Tanzania and Uganda. It occurs in Lake Victoria and some surrounding streams.

References

 

Brycinus
Taxa named by George Albert Boulenger
Fish described in 1912
Taxonomy articles created by Polbot